is a former Japanese football player and manager.

Playing career
Suzuki was born in Shiogama on April 8, 1956. After graduating from high school, he joined Yomiuri in 1975 and he played until 1986. In 1989, he came back as player and coach at his local club Tohoku Electric Power (later Brummell Sendai). He retired in 1995.

Coaching career
In 1989, Suzuki started coaching career as coach at his local club Tohoku Electric Power (later Brummell Sendai, Vegalta Sendai). In 1990, he became a manager and he managed until 1995. In 1998, he came back to Brummell Sendai. However the club lost 10 games in a row in 1999 and he resigned in July.

Club statistics

Managerial statistics

References

External links

1956 births
Living people
Association football people from Miyagi Prefecture
Japanese footballers
Japan Soccer League players
Japan Football League (1992–1998) players
Tokyo Verdy players
Vegalta Sendai players
Japanese football managers
J2 League managers
Vegalta Sendai managers
People from Shiogama, Miyagi
Association football midfielders